Jonathan Joseph India (born December 15, 1996) is an American professional baseball infielder for the Cincinnati Reds of Major League Baseball (MLB).

India starred in baseball for American Heritage School. While playing for the Florida Gators, India was named an All-American in 2018, and won the Southeastern Conference Player of the Year in 2018. The Reds selected him with the fifth overall selection in the 2018 MLB draft. India reached the major leagues in 2021 and won the National League Rookie of the Year award.

Amateur career
India attended American Heritage School in Delray Beach, Florida. He was drafted by the Milwaukee Brewers in the 26th round of the 2015 Major League Baseball Draft, but did not sign and attended the University of Florida, where he played college baseball for the Florida Gators baseball team.

As a freshman at the University of Florida in 2016, India had a .303 batting average, a .367 on-base percentage (OBP), and a .440 SLG, with four home runs and 40 runs batted in (RBI). He was named a freshman All-American by Louisville Slugger. and the Southeastern Conference (SEC) First Team All-Freshman Team. Following his freshman season at Florida, India played collegiate summer baseball for the Harwich Mariners of the Cape Cod Baseball League, where he batted 18-for-62 (.290) with seven doubles and 4 RBIs.

As a sophomore in 2017, he hit .274/.354/.429 with six home runs and 34 RBI and was a member of Florida's 2017 College World Series winning team. He missed some of the beginning of the season due to an arm injury. India again played for the Mariners in the Cape Cod League after the season.

As a junior in 2018, India batted .350/.497/.717 with 21 home runs which was sixth in the nation. India won the Southeastern Conference Baseball Player of the Year, which is awarded to the top player in the SEC. He was also named a Baseball America All-American.

Professional career
India was considered one of the top prospects for the 2018 Major League Baseball draft, and was selected fifth overall by the Cincinnati Reds. India signed with the Reds for $5.3 million, and began his professional career with the Greeneville Reds of the Rookie League Appalachian League, where he batted .261 with three home runs. He was moved to the Billings Mustangs of the Pioneer League on July 26 to get playing time at shortstop. He hit .250 with two singles in three games for Billings. On July 30, India was promoted to Class A Midwest League Dayton Dragons and ended the season there, batting .229 with three home runs and 11 RBIs in 27 games.
 
India began 2019 with the Daytona Tortugas of the Class A-Advanced Florida State League, earning FSL All-Star honors.

On March 31, 2021, the Cincinnati Reds announced India would make his major league debut on Opening Day, after being selected to make the team by way of a strong showing in spring training. Buzz about the move surfaced several days prior to the announcement, after his mother prematurely congratulated him on Instagram. On April 1, 2021, India was selected to the 40-man roster, and made his major league debut as the Opening Day starting second baseman. After striking out in his first at bat, India got his first major league hit in his second, a double down the left field line off of St. Louis Cardinals starting pitcher Jack Flaherty, and also collected a single off of Ryan Helsley in at bat number three.

On April 22, 2021, India hit his first career home run at home against the Arizona Diamondbacks. On July 30, India had his first multi-home run game, hitting two homers to help beat the New York Mets, 6-2. On August 4, 2021, India was awarded July NL Rookie of the Month. India slashed .319/.470/.527 with four home runs and 12 RBIs over 25 games. India finished the 2021 season batting .269/.376/.459 with 21 home runs, 69 RBIs and 98 runs scored. He swung at a lower percentage of pitches in the strike zone than any other major leaguer, at 58.2%. He won the NL Rookie of the Year Award in a near unanimous-vote, receiving 29 of 30 first-place votes.

References

External links

Florida Gators bio

1996 births
Living people
People from Plantation, Florida
Baseball players from Florida
Major League Baseball infielders
Major League Baseball Rookie of the Year Award winners
Cincinnati Reds players
Florida Gators baseball players
Harwich Mariners players
Greeneville Reds players
Billings Mustangs players
Dayton Dragons players
Daytona Tortugas players
Chattanooga Lookouts players
Glendale Desert Dogs players
All-American college baseball players
Sportspeople from Delray Beach, Florida